Washington's 26th legislative district is one of forty-nine districts in Washington state for representation in the state legislature. 

The district includes southeastern Kitsap Peninsula from Bremerton and Port Orchard in the north to Gig Harbor in the south. 

The district's legislators are state senator Emily Randall (D) and state representatives Spencer Hutchins (R; position 1) and Michelle Caldier (R; position 2).

See also
Washington Redistricting Commission
Washington State Legislature
Washington State Senate
Washington House of Representatives

References

External links
Washington State Redistricting Commission
Washington House of Representatives
Map of Legislative Districts

26
Kitsap County, Washington
Pierce County, Washington